This article shows the men's tournament for the 2005 Bolivarian Games, held from August 13 to 18, 2005 at the Mayor Coliseum in Pereira, Colombia.

Competing Nations

Squads

Preliminary round

Final round

Semifinals

Finals

Bronze-medal match

Gold-medal match

Final standings

References

2005 in volleyball
Volleyball at the Bolivarian Games
International volleyball competitions hosted by Colombia
2005 Bolivarian Games